Lewisham East is a parliamentary constituency represented in the House of Commons of the UK Parliament since the by-election on 14 June 2018 by Janet Daby of the Labour Party.

History
Lewisham East was created for the 1918 general election. From 1945 to 1950 the seat was represented by cabinet minister Herbert Morrison of the Labour Party, who took the seat from its first MP, Conservative Assheton Pownall, a former army officer.

The seat was abolished in 1950 but recreated in 1974. From 1979 to 1997 the constituency was a marginal seat. The MP from 1983 to 1992 was Minister for Sport Colin Moynihan (Conservative). Since the 1997 general election the seat has swung towards Labour; in 2014 Labour won a landslide victory at the local council elections, with the Liberal Democrats losing ten seats and the Conservatives losing their only remaining councillor, while Steve Bullock was re-elected as the directly elected mayor of Lewisham, having held the office since its creation in 2002. Lewisham East had the 51st largest Labour vote share in the country at the 2015 election, out of 650 constituencies.

Constituency profile

The constituency stretches from Blackheath, which has more in common with the more affluent areas of the Royal Borough of Greenwich (which contains the north and east parts of Blackheath) to the wards to the south of the constituency which contain more social housing and less architectural grandeur. Incidence of social deprivation is highest towards downtown Lewisham and the Rushey Green area of Catford, a low-to-middle income area which was home to one of the first indoor shopping malls in England.

At the southern end of the constituency is Grove Park, one of the quieter and more prosperous parts of Lewisham, which is more marginal between Labour and the Conservatives than the rest of the borough. Some wards in the constituency are steadily increasing in average income and median age, and thus have become Conservative targets in local elections. Nonetheless, Labour MP Heidi Alexander increased her majority in 2015 and then again in 2017. In the by-election of 2018, the Labour vote fell from 68% to 50%.

Boundaries 

1918–1950: The Metropolitan Borough of Lewisham wards of Blackheath, Church, Lewisham Park, Manor, and South, and parts of the wards of Catford and Lewisham Village.

1974–1983: The London Borough of Lewisham wards of Blackheath and Lewisham Village, Grove Park, Lewisham Park, Manor Lee, St Andrew, St Mildred Lee, South Lee, Southend, and Whitefoot.

1983–2010: The London Borough of Lewisham wards of Blackheath, Churchdown, Downham, Grove Park, Hither Green, Manor Lee, St Margaret, St Mildred, and Whitefoot.

2010–present: The London Borough of Lewisham wards of Blackheath, Catford South, Downham, Grove Park, Lee Green, Rushey Green, and Whitefoot.

The 2010 redrawing of boundaries replaced Lewisham West with a cross-borough constituency, Lewisham West and Penge, requiring changes to the other seats in the borough. 
Lewisham East received:
Catford South, and parts of Rushey Green and Whitefoot wards from the former constituency of Lewisham West. 
Part of Rushey Green from Lewisham Deptford
Lewisham East lost:
Part of Lewisham Central to Lewisham Deptford.

Members of Parliament

Election results

Elections in the 2010s

Elections in the 2000s

Elections in the 1990s

Elections in the 1980s

Elections in the 1970s

Elections in the 1940s

Elections in the 1930s

Elections in the 1920s

Elections in the 1910s

See also 
List of parliamentary constituencies in London

References

Bibliography

External links 
Politics Resources (Election results from 1922 onwards)
Electoral Calculus (Election results from 1955 onwards)

Politics of the London Borough of Lewisham
Parliamentary constituencies in London
Constituencies of the Parliament of the United Kingdom established in 1918
Constituencies of the Parliament of the United Kingdom disestablished in 1950
Constituencies of the Parliament of the United Kingdom established in 1974